The French Gratitude Train, commonly referred to as the Merci Train, were 49 World War I era "forty and eight" boxcars gifted to the United States by France in response to the 1947 U.S. Friendship Train. It arrived in Weehawken, New Jersey on February 3, 1949.

Background 
The idea to send a "thank you" gift to the United States for the $40 million in food and other supplies sent to France and Italy in 1947 came from a French railroad worker, and World War II veteran, named Andre Picard.  Donations from the Merci Train came from over six million citizens of France and Italy in the form of dolls, statues, clothes, ornamental objects, furniture, and even a Legion of Honour medal purported to have belonged to Napoleon.

History 

The boxcars were "forty-and-eights" used during both world wars. The term refers to the cars' carrying capacity, said to be 40 men or eight horses.  Built starting in the 1870s as regular freight boxcars, they were originally used in military service by the French army in both World Wars, and then later used by the German occupation in World War II and finally by the Allied liberators.

In 1949, France sent 49 of those boxcars to the United States (one for each state and the Territory of Hawaii) laden with various treasures, as a show of gratitude for the liberation of France. This train was called the Merci Train, and was sent in response to trains full (over 700 boxcars) of supplies known as the Friendship Train sent by the American people to France in 1947. Each of the Merci Train boxcars carried five tons of gifts, all of which were donated by private citizens.

The Train and all 49 cars arrived aboard the Magellan on February 3, 1949, with over 25,000 onlookers in attendance.  On the side of the gift-laden French freighter was painted, "MERCI AMERICA". Immediately the trains were distributed amongst the states.

Boxcars 
The Merci Train boxcars were opened and turned into travelling exhibits before each state committee distributed the entire contents. The 43 surviving boxcars are on public display within each state as follows:

References

Further reading

External links 

 Merci Train
 Merci Train at Historical Marker Database

1949 in France
1949 in international relations
1949 in the United States
Aftermath of World War II in the United States
Diplomatic gifts
French Fourth Republic
France–United States relations
Gratitude
Historic buildings and structures in the United States
Tourist attractions in the United States
Wooden buildings and structures in the United States